Figment may refer to:

 Figment (Disney), Disney character
 Figment (arts event), arts event
 Figment (website), website